Cory Thiesse ( Christensen; born December 1, 1994) is an American curler from Duluth, Minnesota. She is currently the defending U.S. champion skip, and represented her country at the 2022 World Women's Curling Championship. Christensen was one of the top junior women's curlers in the United States, playing in six national junior championships and winning four of them. She was the alternate on Nina Roth's 2018 United States Olympic team.

In 2019 Thiesse and mixed doubles partner John Shuster won the United States Mixed Doubles Championship and earned the bronze medal at the World Mixed Doubles Championship.

Career

2010–2013: Early juniors
Thiesse's first appearance on the national stage was at the 2011 United States Junior National Championships, where she finished fifth. Out of her six Junior National appearances, that would be the only time she did not play in the championship final. At the 2012 Junior Championships Thiesse returned with the same team of third Elizabeth Busche, second Anna Bauman and lead Sonja Bauman. Thiesse skipped her team to victory, earning her first national title and her first opportunity to represent the United States at the World Junior Championships. At the 2012 World Juniors in Ostersund, Sweden, Thiesse's team finished with a winless 0–9 record. Tragedy struck just weeks after competing at the World Championship when Thiesse's vice-skip Busche died from cancer. Buche's sudden, young death hit Thiesse and the rest of the Duluth junior curlers hard.

The next season Thiesse returned to competition with the Bauman sisters remaining on the front end of the team and Rebecca Funk replacing Busche at third. The team started the season off strong, winning the Minnesota Junior Women's State Championship. At the 2013 Junior Nationals it looked like Thiesse was going to defend to her title when she finished the round-robin as the number one seed with a 8–1 record, but ultimately she had to settle for the silver medal when they lost the final to Miranda Solem's team by a single point. Thiesse would still get to play at the 2013 World Junior Championships though, as Solem asked her to join as their alternate. Thiesse would play in four games at the World Juniors as they finished in seventh place with a 4–5 record.

After Thiesse returned from the World Championship she rejoined her Junior Nationals team, plus Mackenzie Lank as alternate, for one more event at the end of the season, the qualifier to represent the United States at the 2013 Winter Universiade. The University Games Qualifier had five of the top Junior Women's teams and six of the top Junior Men's teams in the country competing. Tied after the round-robin, Thiesse defeated Becca Hamilton's team in a tiebreaker to earn their trip to the Winter Universiade next season.

2013–2016: Junior High Performance Program
Over the 2013 off-season it was announced that the Christensen team was joining the United States Curling Association's (USCA) Project 2018 Program, to which they were invited due to winning the University Games Qualifier at the end of the previous season. The Project 2018 Program was a part of the USCA High Performance Program intended to nurture junior curlers, with success at the 2018 Winter Olympics as the goal.

Thiesse , Funk, and the Bauman sisters started the 2013–14 season off playing in a series of World Curling Tour (WCT) bonspiels as a lead up to the 2013 Winter Universiade. They only won one game in each of the Fort Wayne Summer Cash Spiel, the St. Paul Cash Spiel, and the Molson Cash Spiel but won the 2013 FSCC Early Cash bonspiel in Blaine, Minnesota, their first WCT win. At the Winter Universiade, held in Trentino, Italy, Sonja Bauman and Mackenzie Lank swapped positions, with Lank taking over at lead. The team missed the playoffs, finished the round-robin in eighth place with a 3–6 record.

The USCA's High Performance Advisory Group picked Thiesse 's team and Korey Dropkin's team (the American boys' team at the Winter Universiade) to automatically earn berths at the 2014 United States Junior Nationals so they didn't need to worry about play-downs, which were held very close in time to when the Winter Universiade occurred. Thiesse 's team had a slightly tweaked line-up for Junior Nationals, with MacKenzie Lank at third, Anna Bauman still at second, Anna Hopkins joining the team at lead, and Sonja Bauman remaining as alternate. With a win over Sarah Anderson's team in the final, Thiesse earned her second Junior Nationals title. At the 2014 World Junior Championship Thiesse missed the payoffs, finishing in 6th place with a 5–4 record.

After the 2013–14 season the USCA revamped their High Performance Program from team-based to individual-based; curlers would be invited into the program as individuals and then assigned teammates. Thiesse was selected as the skip of the junior women's team, to play with Sarah Anderson at third, MacKenzie Lank at second, Jenna Haag at lead, and Sarah's twin sister Taylor Anderson as alternate. The new Team Thiesse won the 2014 Molson Cash Spiel, a WCT event, defeating Canadian Kendra Lilly in the final. They then won the 2015 Junior National Championship, defeating Madison Bear's team 10–6 in nine ends in the final. A month later Thiesse made her first non-junior national appearance when her team competed at the 2015 United States Women's Championship. They finished the round-robin with a 8–1 record but lost in the 3 vs 4 page playoff game to Patti Lank, MacKenzie's mother and a five-time United States champion. At the 2015 World Juniors Christensen finished the round-robin with a 5–4 record, the same as in 2014, but this time it was good enough to tie Lisa Gisler's Switzerland team for the last playoffs berth. Christensen lost the tiebreaker game to Gisler, who would go on to win the bronze medal.

Also during the 2014–15 season Thiesse made her competitive debut in mixed doubles, a discipline of curling where teams are composed of one man and one woman. Thiesse teamed up with Derek Benson for the 2015 United States Mixed Doubles Championship. They finished with a 2–3 record, missing the playoffs, but one of their two wins was over Maureen and Peter Stolt, who went on to win the silver medal.

Coming into the 2015–16 season Thiesse's team again had line-up changes since MacKenzie Lank was no longer part of the USCA High Performance Program and Jenna Haag had graduated from juniors to women's. Sarah Anderson kept her spot at third, Taylor Anderson moved to second, Madison Bear joined the team at lead, and Christine McMakin joined as alternate. They again won a WCT event early in the season, going undefeated at the 2015 St. Paul Cash Spiel. At the 2016 Junior National Championship the team finished with a perfect 11–0 record, never even needing to play a full ten end game. This was Thiesse's third Junior title in a row and fourth overall, the second most for a women's skip after Erika Brown's five titles. It was also Thiesse and the Anderson twins' last Junior Nationals due to ageing out of juniors after this season. Winning Junior Nationals earned Team Christensen a spot at the Women's National Championship in Jacksonville, Florida, where they earned the fourth seed in the playoffs with a 3–3 round-robin record. They defeated Jamie Sinclair in the 3 vs 4 page playoff game but then lost to Nina Roth in the semifinals, earning the bronze medal.

At Thiesse's final World Junior Championship she found her greatest success, finishing the round-robin with a 7–2 record, good enough for the second seed in the page playoff system. In the 1 vs 2 playoff game Thiesse defeated the number one seed Canada, skipped by Mary Fay. This gave the United States a path straight to the final where they ultimately faced Canada again, this time losing 4–7 to earn the silver medal.

Thiesse did not return to the Mixed Doubles National Championship in 2016 but did join John Shuster to compete at the USCA's World Mixed Doubles Trials, a separate competition held to determine the United States representative at the 2016 World Mixed Doubles Championship. Shuster and Thiesse made it through a playdown of the USCA High Performance athletes to earn a spot in the World Trials. At the World Trials they finished with a 2–5 record.

2016–2019: Women's and mixed doubles
No longer in juniors, Thiesse and the Anderson twins were reunited with their former teammate Jenna Haag, who had aged out of juniors a year before them, for the 2016–17 season. Thiesse returned to the St. Paul Cash Spiel and successfully defended her previous year's title, only losing one game throughout the tournament. At the 2017 United States Women's Championship Team Christensen missed the playoffs, finishing with a 4–3 record. Despite falling short at Nationals, Thiesse still got to compete at the 2017 World Women's Championship when Nina Roth's team added her as their alternate. At Worlds they finished in fifth place.

Team Christensen maintained their line-up for the 2017–18 season, with the exception of Phill Drobnick replacing Ann Swisshelm as coach. They were one of only three women's teams competing at the 2017 United States Olympic Curling Trials, attempting to earn the chance to represent the United States at the 2018 Winter Olympics. At the Trials Team Christensen only won one game and Nina Roth's team ultimately became the Olympic team, but Thiesse was again asked to be the alternate for Team Roth (the same position she filled at the 2017 World Championship). At the Olympics the team missed the playoffs, finishing eighth with a record of 4–5.

Only a week after the women's curling wrapped up at the Olympics Thiesse was at the 2018 United States Women's Championship with her usual team of Sarah Anderson, Taylor Anderson, and Jenna Martin (née Haag). Team Christensen defeated Cora Farrell's team in the semifinals to face the defending champions, Team Jamie Sinclair, in the final. Thiesse and Sinclair were tied after nine ends, but Sinclair scored a single point in the final end to win the gold medal.

The next season brought a new line-up for Team Christensen. The Anderson twins left to join Jamie Sinclair, replaced by Madison Bear at lead and Vicky Persinger at third, and Jenna Martin moved to second. The team also got a new coach, Canadian Darah Blandford, in her first year with the USCA High Performance Program. Christensen was chosen to represent the United States at the third leg of the Curling World Cup in Jönköping, Sweden; the Curling World Cup was a four-part international tournament held around the world throughout the curling season.  There they finished with a 3–3 record.

At the 2019 United States Women's Championship Thiesse finished the round-robin with a record of 5–2, good enough for the third seed in the page playoffs. In the 3 vs. 4 playoff game they defeated Stephanie Senneker's team by one point, 9–8. In the semifinal match against Nina Roth's team it came down to the last stone but Roth came through with the win, resulting in the bronze medal for Thiesse .

Thiesse continued to compete in mixed doubles with John Shuster. The pair finished in second place at the 2017 United States Mixed Doubles Curling Olympic Trials and earned a national championship in 2019.  For winning the National Championship Thiesse and Shuster got to continue on to the 2019 World Mixed Doubles Curling Championship, where they defeated Australia to earn the bronze medal. Thiesse and Shuster were named the United States Curling Association's 2019 Team of the Year for their accomplishments in mixed doubles.

2019–2020: Team Sinclair
Shortly after the 2018–19 curling season ended it was announced that Thiesse's team was dissolving; Martin decided to step away from competitive curling, Bear became skip of her own team, and Thiesse and Persinger joined Jamie Sinclair's team. Thiesse and Persinger took the third and second spots on Team Sinclair, respectively, while Sarah and Taylor Anderson, who had previously played those positions, moved up to lead and alternate. Retired Canadian curler Cathy Overton-Clapham joined Team Sinclair as their coach for the 2019–20 season. On the WCT the team won the Red Deer Curling Classic and followed it a couple of weeks later by making it to the quarterfinals at the Curl Mesabi Classic, where they lost to Tabitha Peterson's team.

The 2020 United States Women's Championship was the first national championship for Thiesse in a position other than skip. Thiesse and Team Sinclair only lost one game in the round robin, earning the number one seed in the playoffs. In the 1 vs. 2 page playoff Thiesse lost to Tabitha Peterson's team, who they faced again in the final after defeating Ariel Traxler's junior team in the semifinals. Peterson defeated Team Sinclair a second time in the final, with a final score of 7–5, resulting in Thiesse's second Women's Nationals silver medal.

2020–present: Team Christensen redux
At the end of the 2020 curling season, Thiesse and the other three members of Team Sinclair chose to form a new team within the U.S. High Performance Program. The new Team Christensen consisted of Cory as skip, Sarah Anderson third, Vicky Persinger second, and Taylor Anderson lead, with Cathy Overton-Clapham as coach. However, the 2020-21 season was largely shut down due to the COVID-19 pandemic. The team ended the abbreviated season by winning the 2021 United States Women's Curling Championship, which was held in May that year, after being postponed from February. Thiesse finished the round robin with a 5–1 record, and won both of her playoff games, including defeating her former skip Jamie Sinclair in the final.

The following season, Christensen played in the 2021 United States Olympic Curling Trials. Her team finished the round robin with a 7–3 record, putting her into the best-of-three final against Tabitha Peterson. The Thiesse rink lost two straight, missing a chance to make it to the 2021 Olympics. After the 2022 US Women's Championship were cancelled, Thiesse was invited to represent the United States at the 2022 World Women's Curling Championship. There, she led the United States to a 8–4 round robin record, and lost in the qualification game against Sweden's Anna Hasselborg. Thiesse wrapped up the season by playing in the 2022 Champions Cup Grand Slam event, where she missed the playoffs. In mixed doubles, she and partner John Shuster went 5–4 at the 2021 United States mixed doubles curling Olympic trials, and lost in a tiebreaker to Jamie Sinclair and Rich Ruohonen.

Personal life
Thiesse grew up in Duluth, Minnesota. She started curling at an early age, facilitated by both of her parents curling and the local Duluth Curling Club having a strong youth program. Her mom Linda Christensen has found competitive success on the curling ice as well, winning the United States Senior Curling Championship twice, in 2015 and 2016, and earning the bronze medal at the 2015 World Senior Championship.

Thiesse studied exercise science at the University of Minnesota, Duluth. She works as a pharmacy technician.

On June 4, 2022 she married Sam Thiesse.

Awards 

 2011 Women's Curtis Cup for Sportsmanship
 USA Curling’s 2016 Female Athlete of the Year
 USA Curling's 2019 Team of the Year

Teams

Women's

Mixed doubles

Grand Slam record

References

External links

1994 births
Living people
Sportspeople from Duluth, Minnesota
American female curlers
Curlers at the 2018 Winter Olympics
Olympic curlers of the United States
21st-century American women